Jurij bin Jalaluddin is a Malaysian politician from UMNO. He has been the Member of Perak State Legislative Assembly for Lubok Merbau from 2018 to November 2022.

Education 
He has studied at Clifford School Kuala Kangsar and is a Bachelor of Business Administration and Doctor of Philosophy (PhD) from National University of Malaysia.

Politics 
He is the former Senior Private Secretary of the Ministry of Tourism, Arts and Culture Malaysia.

Election results

External links

References 

United Malays National Organisation politicians
Members of the Perak State Legislative Assembly
Malaysian people of Malay descent
Living people
Year of birth missing (living people)